Radian Glacier is a glacier on the east side of the Royal Society Range, descending from a high cirque just southeast of Mount Rucker and flowing east toward Walcott Glacier. In the measurements made of this glacier by the Victoria University of Wellington Antarctic Expedition (VUWAE) (1960–61), one of the survey angles, by chance, was exactly one radian, and the glacier came to be referred to by this term.

Radian Ridge is a ridge named in association with Radian Glacier.

References

 

Glaciers of Victoria Land
Scott Coast